The Annapurna Express is an English-language broadsheet newspaper previously published and distributed weekly but Daily from 15th Dec 2022 in Nepal. It was started in 2017 by Annapurna Media Network, which also owns Annapurna Post, AP1 TV and Radio Annapurna Nepal.

ApEx Pioneers
The Annapurna Express held an event named Salute  on May 23,2022 to honor 100 individuals for their contributions to all facets of life. The 50 pioneers received a token of love, while the 50 visionaries received a medal of distinction.

ApEx Series
ApEx Series is a five-part detailed reporting on a particular topic. The Annapurna Express has already completed ApEx Series on Ropeways in Nepal, Climate Change, NEPSE and Domestic Violence among others.

References

External links 

 

Newspapers published in Nepal
English-language newspapers published in Asia